Miramont-de-Guyenne (literally Miramont of Guyenne) is a commune in the Lot-et-Garonne department in south-western France.

See also
Communes of the Lot-et-Garonne department

Pictures

References

Miramontdeguyenne
Lot-et-Garonne communes articles needing translation from French Wikipedia